Giacomo Fei (born February 10, 1992 in Arezzo) is an Italian professional football player currently playing for Lega Pro Seconda Divisione team Atletico Arezzo on loan from ACF Fiorentina.

External links
 

1992 births
Living people
Italian footballers
A.S.D. Sangiovannese 1927 players
Association football forwards
Sportspeople from Arezzo
Footballers from Tuscany